Yerevan's first jazz band was formed in 1936, by composer and trumpeter Tsolak Vardazaryan. In 1938, composer Artemi Ayvazyan founded the Armenian State Jazz Orchestra, the first in the Soviet Union. The orchestra's first drummer Robert Yolchyan became an important artist of Soviet and Armenian jazz, developing his own style over time and continuing to play and give master-classes until his death in early 2000s. Other jazz bands were founded in Nairi Cinema, Yerevan Park of Communars, and others. In 1954, Konstantin Orbelyan organized an Estrada quintet for Armenian Radio. In 1966, young composer Martin Vardazaryan founded the Estrada Orchestra, renamed in the 1970s as the Estrada Symphonic Orchestra under the direction of Melik Mavisakalyan and Yervand Yerznkyan. Then Stepan Shakaryan founded the jazz sextet Radio, and jazz trios were founded by David Azaryan and Artashes Kartalyan. Jazz pianist Levon Malkhasian ("Malkhas") founded his jazz trio with Armen Toutounjyan ("Chico") and Arthur Abrahamyan. In 1998, Malkhas become one of the initiators of the Yerevan International Jazz Festival.

In 2009 Garik Saribekyan founded his "Nuance Jazz Band", which performs ethnic jazz. Among the leading modern jazz musicians are conductor and pianist Armen Martirosyan, pianists Vahagn Hayrapetyan ("Petian"), Vardan Ovsepian, and Tigran Hamasyan, and saxophonist Armen Hyusnunts.

See also
Armenian music
www.armjazz.info

References

Armenian Jazz 70. The past and present of Armenian Jazz